Abdulcadir Muhammed Aden was a Somali political figure and activist.

History
Abdulcadir was born to a Rahanweyn family.

Having joined several independence movements as early as 1940, he was the leading representative and president of the Hisbia Digil Mirifle, Somalia's second largest political party.

Following the formation of the first Somali government in 1956, Zoobe was elected as the first Vice President of the National Assembly, acting as deputy to then President Aden Abdulle Osman. At Independence, he occupied numerous portfolios including Ministry of Finance and Interior.

In 1989, he signed the Manifesto and joined his clansmen in forming the SDM, a paramilitary and political organisation aimed at liberating the Inter riverine region from the Siad Barre regime. Zoobe is credited as an early forerunner of Federalism in Somalia having personally led a campaign since 1950.

References

2002 deaths
Year of birth missing
Somalian activists